The United States Army Band, also known as "Pershing's Own", is the premier musical organization of the United States Army, founded in 1922. There are currently nine official performing ensembles in the unit: The U.S. Army Concert Band, The U.S. Army Ceremonial Band, The U.S. Army Chorus, The U.S. Army Blues, The U.S. Army Band Downrange, The U.S. Army Herald Trumpets, The U.S. Army Strings, The U.S. Army Voices, and The U.S. Army Brass Quintet.

History

The United States Army Band was established on 25 January 1922 by General of the Armies John J. Pershing, Army Chief of Staff in emulation of European military bands he heard during World War I. In its early years, the band was featured on RCA, CBS, the Mutual Broadcasting Network, and other networks. The band also completed four national tours between 1928 and 1931 and was noted for its professionalism during a trip to Spain for the Ibero-American Exposition of 1929.

In June 1943, the United States Army Band was called overseas to perform in North Africa and in Europe during World War II. The band received a campaign streamer for their efforts during the Rhineland Campaign. This period also saw the band perform with numerous well-known artists and composers, many as part of the very successful Freedom Sings concert series that started in 1950 and continued for several years. Notable musicians included Metropolitan Opera bass Jerome Hines, composers Paul Hindemith and Percy Grainger, and the pianist duo Whittmore and Lowe. Similarly, several well-known entertainers and recording artists were band members during this period. Eddie Fisher, Robert Dini, and Steve Lawrence were very popular during the 1950s, as were harpist Lloyd Lindroth, future Metropolitan Opera tenor George Shirley, and announcer Charles Osgood.

Throughout the 1960s, 1970s and 1980s, the United States Army Band continued to perform and serve with distinction. In 1963, the band participated in the state funeral of John F. Kennedy with Army Band Bugler Keith Clark performing "Taps" during final interment at Arlington National Cemetery. Brucker Hall, the band's training and performance facility, was constructed in the mid-1970s. Also during this era, the Army Blues, the Army Brass Quintet, the Army Chorale (now operating as 'Downrange'), and the Army Brass Band were officially established as regular performing ensembles. An official Coat of Arms and distinctive uniforms were approved to reflect the band's increasing visibility at events of national significance, including the visit of Emperor Hirohito to Alaska with President Richard Nixon, the United States Bicentennial in 1976, the Lake Placid Winter Olympics 1980, the return of hostages during the Iran Hostage Crisis, the 1982 World's Fair in Knoxville, Tennessee, and the 1984 Olympic Games in Los Angeles.

The United States Army Band has performed in Canada, Japan, and Australia as well as in several of the nation's prominent concert halls, such as Carnegie Hall, Radio City Music Hall, and the Guggenheim Band Shell at Lincoln Center in New York City, the Hollywood Bowl in Los Angeles, and the Hatch Shell in Boston. In 1984, the band recorded and participated in the filming of Francis Ford Coppola's movie Gardens of Stone.

Under the leadership of Colonel L. Bryan Shelburne, leader and commander (1990–2000), the band continued with performances at the 1990 Economic Summit in Houston, the Desert Storm Victory Parade in New York City, and Reba McEntire's Christmas Special in Nashville. Col. Shelburne also led the band in performances in Sweden, the Netherlands, Turkey, Nova Scotia, Scotland, and a concert of International Goodwill with the Soviet Union's Navy Band in Stockholm.

In November 1997, the United States Army Band put on a grand concert at Carnegie Hall in New York City. Guest artists included Walter Cronkite, Charles Osgood, and Metropolitan Opera stars Roberta Peters and John Cheek. In April 2000, Colonel Gary F. Lamb returned to the United States Army Band.

In December 2002, a ten-piece pop group from the band, dubbed "Downrange", accompanied country musician Darryl Worley, comedian Kathy Griffin, actress Karri Turner, pro wrestler Bradshaw, and two cheerleaders from the Jacksonville Jaguars to Uzbekistan, Kuwait, and Afghanistan as part of a pre-Christmas USO tour in support of Operation Enduring Freedom. This was the first time since 1945 that members of the band performed in a theater of foreign operations. Since the commencement of Operation Iraqi Freedom in 2003, the tour has been repeated annually under the title "Hope and Freedom", with a larger ensemble and additional stops at military positions in Iraq. Other celebrities that have accompanied recent tours include country singer Mark Wills, comedian Al Franken, and cheerleaders from the Washington Redskins.

Colonel Lamb retired in June 2005 and was succeeded by Colonel Thomas Rotondi Jr., whose previous assignment was Commander/Conductor of the United States Military Academy Band in West Point, New York.

The United States Army Band is headquartered at Fort Myer in Arlington, Virginia, and annually hosts The United States Army Band Tuba-Euphonium Conference in January and Eastern Trombone Workshop in March.

Leaders

Lineage

Organized 22 January 1922 at Fort Hunt, Virginia, as The Army Band
Discontinued 31 January 1948 at Fort Myer, Virginia
Re-constituted 17 August 1949 in the Regular Army; concurrently consolidated with the United States Army Band (active) (constituted 8 January 1948 in the Regular Army; activated 31 January 1948 at Fort Myer, Virginia) and consolidated unit designated as The United States Army Band.

Honors

Campaign Participation Credit

World War II:
 Rhineland Campaign

Decorations

Meritorious Unit Commendation (Army) for WASHINGTON, DC 1969–1971
Meritorious Unit Commendation (Army) for WASHINGTON, DC 1971–1973
Army Superior Unit Award for 1987
Army Superior Unit Award for 1992–1993

Media

Video

Audio

See also
United States military bands

References

External links

The U.S. Army Band official website

 

Bands of the United States Army
Wind bands
Musical groups established in 1922
Articles containing video clips
Ceremonial units of the United States military